HMAS Anaconda was an auxiliary vessel operated by the Royal Australian Navy (RAN) during the Second World War. She was launched in 1944 in Tasmania, as Australian Army AV 1369 Lagunta, transferred to the RAN and commissioned on 23 May 1945. She was used by the Services Reconnaissance Department for clandestine operations in the waters of Borneo, Morotai, New Guinea, and the Philippines. Anaconda was paid off on 3 November 1945. She was sold in Sydney in 1946 and was apparently converted into a fishing vessel.

Citations

References
Naval Historical Society of Australia - "On this day" (May-July 1945)

1944 ships
Auxiliary ships of the Royal Australian Navy
Ships built in Tasmania